Mirdamad Boulevard is the center of Davoodiyeh district in the north of Tehran. The boulevard starts from Valiasr Street in its west and continues eastward passing Mother Square up to Shariati street. Central Bank of the Islamic Republic of Iran is located in this boulevard.

There are some other important buildings in this boulevard too, for example Eskan towers, Payetakht Computer Center and Arian Mall. There are also some classy boutiques and malls in Mirdamad, most of which located at the eastern part of the street, near Maadar (formerly and still known as Mohseni) Sq. where you can find expensive and designer brands and many young and rich people who can afford it.

Gallery

See also

Parvin Etesami Private High School & Pre-University Center, located in the Mirdamad neighborhood.

Streets in Tehran
Articles containing video clips